The Eternal Spring is a 1940 German drama film directed by Fritz Kirchhoff and starring Eugen Klöpfer, Bernhard Minetti and Lina Carstens. It is part of the tradition of Heimatfilm.

It was shot at the Bavaria Studios in Munich. The film's sets were designed by the art directors Ludwig Reiber and Rudolf Pfenninger.

Cast
 Eugen Klöpfer as Lohhofbauer
 Bernhard Minetti as Wolfgang Lusinger
 Lina Carstens as Lohhofbäuerin
 Käte Merk as Maria
 Alexander Trojan as Hannes
 Hannes Keppler as Ludwig
 Albert Hörrmann as Dr. Iwan Wollinsky
 Carl Wery as Sprecher der Bauern
 Georg Vogelsang as Großknecht
 Luis Rainer as Alter Lusinger
 Elise Aulinger as Moosbäuerin
 Fritz Reiff as Richter
 Otto Fassler as 1. Herr der Regierungs-Kommission
 Julius Königsheim as Knecht Toni
 Ludwig Schmid-Wildy as Wirt
 Charles Willy Kayser as 2. Her der Regierungs-Kommission
 Heinz Burkart as Juwelier
  as Goldschmied
 Eugen Schöndorfer as Beamter
 Julius Frey as Metzger
 Hans Hanauer as Bauer
 Erich Teibler as Bub
 Georg Holl as Gendarm
 Fritz Wagner as 2. Knecht
 Else Sensburg as Großmagd
 Willimarie Knoll as Jungmagd
 Konrad Feldmaier as 1. Knecht

References

Bibliography

External links 
 

1940 films
Films of Nazi Germany
German drama films
1940 drama films
1940s German-language films
Films directed by Fritz Kirchhoff
Bavaria Film films
Films shot at Bavaria Studios
German black-and-white films
1940s German films